The Kia Niro is a compact crossover SUV (C-segment) manufactured by Kia since 2016. It is an electrification-focused vehicle, offering three versions: hybrid, plug-in hybrid and battery electric variants.



First generation (DE; 2016) 

The first-generation Niro was introduced in 2016. Based on the same platform as the Hyundai Ioniq, Kia opted to use dual-clutch transmission instead of the more traditional continuously variable transmission found in most other hybrids to offer a more engaging driving experience.

The size is between the Stonic and Sportage, and very close to the XCeed. In Europe, the Niro was launched in a choice of seven colours and either 16- or 18-inch wheels. It was the first Kia model to feature Android Auto, available from its launch, while Apple CarPlay was made available towards the end of 2016. Seven airbags were included as standard, along with other safety features including autonomous braking, smart cruise control and lane departure warning to name a few. Noise reduction was a key development focus, with Kia achieving a quieter cabin by use of increased front structure insulation and the use of acoustic windshield glass.

Full production started in May 2016 in Hwaseong, Gyeonggi, South Korea, with European sales from the third quarter of 2016.

A plug-in version was launched in the United Kingdom in the end of 2017, and in the United States in the beginning of 2018, with an electric version launched in 2018. Towards the end of 2018 and start of 2019, sales of the Niro PHEV ranked highly in Denmark and Sweden in a list of top plug-in car sales.

The Niro received a facelift in 2019 which included changes to the front and rear bumpers, as well as new headlights and color choices. Unlike the prototypes, no production version was ever offered with four wheel drive.

Hybrid (HEV) 
The 2017 Kia Niro Hybrid was unveiled at the 2016 Chicago Auto Show. A subcompact hybrid utility vehicle, the model's exterior design is marketed as "un-hybrid", saying it is more conventional than other hybrid cars.

Its traction battery has a capacity of 1.56 kWh which weighs , with Kia claiming that this offers up to 50 per cent increased energy density and 13 per cent more energy efficiency than rivals. From 2017 onwards, the hybrid does not feature a conventional lead-acid starter 12-volt battery; instead, a 12-volt lithium battery is housed adjacent to the traction battery. This innovation saves weight and maintenance.

In its first month on sale, the Niro hit an all time sales record in the green car market in South Korea, even beating the Hyundai Ioniq.

Plug-in hybrid (PHEV) 
A plug-in electric vehicle (PHEV) variant has been offered since September 2018, featuring an 8.9 kWh battery. The Kia Niro and Niro Plug in Hybrid form part of Kia hybrid range, that also includes the Optima Plug-in Hybrid and Optima Sportswagon Plug-in Hybrid. The Kia Niro went on sale in South Korea on 31 March 2016. The plug-in has the same dual-clutch transmission as the hybrid variant, an important differentiator from most other hybrid and plug-in hybrid vehicles which use a continuously variable transmission.

The Niro PHEV was the best selling plug-in car in Denmark in December 2018, with 1,113 sales representing a 24% share, ahead of the Nissan Leaf which took a 14% share respectively. In Sweden during February 2019, the Niro PHEV claimed 2nd position and share of 11%, behind the Mitsubishi Outlander PHEV with a 17% share.

In 2019, Kia announced facelifted versions of its Niro hybrid variants, with new front and rear bumpers, lights and wheels among the changes to its line-up. LED headlights and fog lights became an optional extra, while two new colours red-orange and plum were added.

Gasoline engine 
Both the hybrid and the plug-in hybrid versions of the Niro feature a gasoline engine.

Niro EV/e-Niro 
A battery electric version of the Niro was launched in 2018 at the International Electric Vehicle Expo in Korea, named Niro EV in Asia and North America and e-Niro in Europe.

It shares powertrain and battery configuration with the Hyundai Kona Electric. Niro EV is available in two battery versions: 39.2 kWh and 64 kWh. The batteries are liquid-cooled lithium ion polymer. Batteries are manufactured/supplied by SK Innovation, which is different from the Kona Electric, which uses batteries from LG Chem.

Both cars are front-wheel drive.

Both versions have a CCS charge port which enables DC rapid charging at up to 77 kW. The onboard charger power is 7.2 kW or optionally 11 kW.

On 3 May 2022, pre-orders of the Niro EV began in South Korea. The Niro EV is equipped with a 64.8 kWh high-voltage battery, smart regenerative braking system 2.0, a heat pump, and a battery heating system. And it can run 463 km (WLTP combined) on a single charge. Also, the battery conditioning function is applied to automatically adjust the battery temperature according to the external environment.

Niro Plus 
Kia introduced the Kia Niro Plus in April 2022. Released in South Korea from the second half of 2022, the Niro Plus is a new variant of the Niro that maximises the onboard space by increasing the height of the vehicle by 80 mm, and by using thinner seats. The total length also increases by 10 mm. The second-row legroom was expanded by 28 mm by adjusting the position of the second-row seat. In addition, the taxi model was applied by additionally applying the power seat and reclining function of the Dongseungseok and lowering the height of the Dongseungseok headrest by 43 mm. An integrated All-in-One Display for taxi model includes navigation, app taximeter, digital tachograph and voice recognition. Two variants are offered: the Kia Niro Plus Taxi (specifically intended for cab drivers and only available in BEV) and the Kia Niro Plus (open to all types of customers and available in HEV, PHEV and BEV). The latter will be exported overseas.

All-in-one display is applied with AI assistant technology associated with navigation system, informing remaining battery amount at destination or suggesting route via charging station when remaining battery amount is insufficient.

Safety 
Euro NCAP
Euro NCAP test results for a LHD variant on a registration from 2016:

2016 Guinness World Record 

Second generation (SG2; 2021) 

The second-generation Niro was released at the 2021 Seoul Mobility Show on 25 November. The front part extended the Tiger Face design from the hood to the fender. A C-pillar integrated with a boomerang-shaped LED rear combination lamp was applied to the side, and a vertical LED rear combination lamp was applied to the rear.

In the interior, recycled fibres were used on the ceiling of the vehicle and water-friendly paint without benzene, toluene, and xylene was added to the door panel. The bio-artificial leather sheet used fibres made from raw materials extracted from eucalyptus leaves. It is also equipped with driver assistance systems and infotainment such as head-up displays, remote smart parking assistance, rear passenger notification, and smart power tailgate.

The model was officially launched on 25 January 2022, while the second-generation Niro EV debuted in April 2022.

Powertrain

Reception 
Popular Mechanics named the 2019 Kia Niro EV as its 2019 Car of the Year, praising it for its normal looks, 239-mile range, and that it can use Volkswagen Group of America's Electrify America chargers to allow the car to be used on long car trips.

The UK's What Car? magazine named the Kia e-Niro its 2019 Car of the Year – the first time the prize had been awarded to an electric vehicle.

The car was chosen as one of the Top 10 Tech Cars by the IEEE in 2018.

Concept models

Concept (2013) 

The Kia Niro concept debuted at the 2013 Frankfurt Auto Show. The car, designed almost entirely by Peter Schreyer at Kia's Frankfurt studio, is a sporty three door subcompact crossover, with butterfly doors that open into the roof panel.

The front wheels are powered by the 1.6-litre Gamma inline-4 producing  mated with a seven speed rotary-shifted dual-clutch transmission, while a 45 hp electric hybrid system powers the rear wheels when driving in rougher road conditions.

KX–3 concept 
The Kia KX–3 concept followed at the November 2014 Guangzhou Auto Show. A turbocharged 1.6-litre engine delivers power to all four wheels via a seven speed dual clutch transmission.

Sales

References

External links 
 

Niro
Niro
Mini sport utility vehicles
Crossover sport utility vehicles
Front-wheel-drive vehicles
Euro NCAP small family cars
Hybrid vehicles
2010s cars
Cars introduced in 2016
Production electric cars